Caloptilia albospersa is a moth of the family Gracillariidae. It is known from Queensland, Australia.

References

albospersa
Moths of Australia
Moths described in 1894